The Black Sea Games was a multi-sport event intended to be held every four years, mainly for nations bordering the Black Sea.

The first such event was held in Trabzon, Turkey July 2 to July 8, 2007. A total of 1,277 athletes (937 men and 340 women) from 11 countries participated, with 186 medals won in 13 different sports.

Subsequent games were originally scheduled for 2010 (Constanța, Romania) and 2014 (Samsun, Turkey), but were not held.

Participating countries

 
 
 
 
 
 
 
 
 
  (Host Nation)
 

Countries that did not participate during the Games :

Sports

Paralympic events were contested in the archery, athletics, and swimming programmes.

Medal table

References

Xinhua (3 July 2007). "First Black Sea Games Kicks off in Turkey", CRIENGLISH.com. Retrieved on 2008-08-30.
"Black Sea Games wrap up, Turkey places second", Today's Zaman. Retrieved on 2008-08-30.

External links
Official website (archived)

 
Black Sea
Multi-sport events in Europe
Multi-sport events in Turkey
2007 in multi-sport events
2007 in Turkish sport
July 2007 sports events in Europe
July 2007 sports events in Asia
Sport in Trabzon